Kalkidan Gezahegne (born 8 May 1991) is an Ethiopian-born Bahraini middle- and long-distance runner. She is the 10,000 metres 2020 Tokyo Olympics silver medallist. 11 years earlier, at age 18, Gezahegne became the youngest ever female World indoor champion when winning 1500 metres.

17-year-old Gezahegne won a silver medal over the 1500m at the 2008 World Junior Championships. She represented Ethiopia before acquiring Bahraini citizenship in 2013.

Life and career
Kalkidan Gezahegne was born in Addis Ababa. She won the silver medal in the 1500 metres at the 2008 World Junior Championships and won another junior silver at the 2009 African Junior Athletics Championships, finishing behind Caster Semenya. Moving up to the senior level, Kalkidan finished eighth in the 1500 m race at the 2009 World Championships and fifth in the 3000 metres at the 2009 World Athletics Final.

Competing at the 2010 IAAF World Indoor Championships, she had a startling comeback to qualify for the final. In the middle of her heat, she collided with Russia's Yevgeniya Zolotova and fell onto the track. She got back up to continue the race, however, and not only caught up with her competitors, but won the race with the fastest time of any runner that day. In the final she outdid compatriot and reigning champion Gelete Burka to win the gold medal. This made the 18-year-old the youngest ever winner of an event at the IAAF World Indoor Championships, beating the previous record set by Gabriela Szabo  15 years earlier. She missed the outdoor season that year due to injury.

On 3 October 2021, Gezahegne broke the world record for the 10 km road race at The Giants Geneva event, running 29:38 and surpassing the previous mark by 5 seconds.

Achievements

International competitions

Personal bests

References

1991 births
Living people
Athletes from Addis Ababa
Ethiopian emigrants to Bahrain
Naturalized citizens of Bahrain
Ethiopian female middle-distance runners
Ethiopian female long-distance runners
Athletes (track and field) at the 2018 Asian Games
Asian Games medalists in athletics (track and field)
Asian Games gold medalists for Bahrain
Medalists at the 2018 Asian Games
World Athletics Indoor Championships winners
Asian Games gold medalists in athletics (track and field)
Athletes (track and field) at the 2020 Summer Olympics
Medalists at the 2020 Summer Olympics
Olympic silver medalists for Bahrain
Olympic silver medalists in athletics (track and field)
Olympic athletes of Bahrain